The 2015–16 Real Betis season was the club's 107th season in its history. It spent the season participating in La Liga, the top-flight of Spanish football, after playing one season in the Segunda División in 2014–15.

Players

Current squad

Out on loan

Competitions

Overall

Overview

La Liga

League table

Results summary

Result round by round

Matches

Copa del Rey

Round of 32

Round of 16

See also
2015–16 La Liga

References

External links
 Official website 

Real Betis seasons
Spanish football clubs 2015–16 season